The 2012 season was IFK Göteborg's 107th in existence, their 80th season in Allsvenskan and their 36th consecutive season in the league. They competed in Allsvenskan where they finished seventh for the third time in a row. IFK Göteborg also participated in one competition in which the club continued playing in for the 2013 season, 2012–13 Svenska Cupen.

Mikael Stahre was appointed new head coach, this after the contract of the former head coach Jonas Olsson wasn't extended. A new captain was announced since former captain Adam Johansson left the squad. Forward Tobias Hysén took over the captaincy.

Players

Squad

Players in/out

In

Out

Squad statistics

Appearances and goals

Disciplinary record

Club

Coaching staff

Other information

Competitions

Overall

Allsvenskan

League table

Results summary

Results by round

Matches
Kickoff times are in UTC+2 unless stated otherwise.

Svenska Cupen

2012–13
The tournament continued into the 2013 season.

Qualification stage

Non competitive

Pre-season
Kickoff times are in UTC+1 unless stated otherwise.

Mid-season
Kickoff times are in UTC+2.

References

IFK Göteborg seasons
IFK Goteborg